Governor Moody may refer to:

Dan Moody (1893–1966), 30th Governor of Texas
John Moody (British Army officer) (died 1736), Deputy Governor of Placentia from 1714 to 1717
Richard Clement Moody (1813–1887), Colonial Governor of the Falkland Islands from 1841 to 1848
Zenas Ferry Moody (1832–1917), 7th Governor of Oregon

See also
Thomas H. Moodie (1878–1948), 19th Governor of North Dakota